JoBeth is a given name. Notable people with the name include:

JoBeth Coleby-Davis (born 1984), Bahamian politician
JoBeth Williams (born 1948), American actress and director

See also
Jo Beth Taylor (born 1971), Australian television presenter, actress and singer

Feminine given names